Vivre ensemble is a 1973 French drama film written, directed by and starring Anna Karina. It was Karina's directorial debut.

Cast
 Bob Asklöf
 Jean Aurel
 Lynn Berkley as Johnny
 Viviane Blassel
 Danny Brown
 Gilles Exbrayat
 Philippe Exbrayat
 Anna Karina as Julie Andersen
 Michel Lancelot
 Raphael Mattei
 Monique Morelli as La Concierge
 Gérard Pereira

References

External links

1973 films
1970s French-language films
1973 drama films
Films directed by Anna Karina
French drama films
1973 directorial debut films
1970s French films